Strike Me Lucky is a 1959 novel written by Jon Cleary in collaboration with his wife Joy. The plot concerns an Australian family who discover gold and the effect this has on their small town.

Background
Cleary originally wrote it as a short story for the Saturday Evening Post. Later while the Clearys were living in Spain, Joy was at a loose end and decided to adapt the story into a novel, which Jon then rewrote. It was published under her name and enjoyed minor success. It was based on a story "Trumpets of Home" which was based on a true story.

Marlon Brando optioned the film rights for his production company Pennebaker, intending to make it as a co-production in England, but no movie was made. However Jon Cleary did later adapt it into a play in 1969.

References

External links
Strike Me Lucky at AustLit (subscription required)

1959 Australian novels
Novels by Jon Cleary